Scott Weaver may refer to:

 Scotty Joe Weaver (1986–2004), murder victim from Bay Minette, Alabama
 Scott C. Weaver, director of Galveston National Laboratory